The World Federation of Advertisers (WFA) is a global association for multinational marketers and national advertiser associations. Its membership is made up of over 140 of the world's top brands and national associations in more than 60 markets. WFA's aim is to champion effective and sustainable marketing communications worldwide.

WFA is based in Brussels, Belgium, and has offices in London, New York and Singapore.

History

WFA was founded in Stresa, Italy, on 14 May 1953 as the Union Internationale des Associations d'Annonceurs (UIAA) at the initiative of ten existing national advertiser associations representing Belgium, Denmark, France, Germany, India, Italy, Luxembourg, Netherlands, Sweden, Switzerland, and the UK. In 1984, at the Rio de Janeiro World Congress, the UIAA changed its name to the World Federation of Advertisers (WFA) and opened its doors to corporate members.

Activities

In 2019, WFA formed the Global Alliance for Responsible Media (GARM), a global cross-industry alliance which aims to improve digital safety and eliminate harmful online content. GARM is made up of advertisers, agencies, media companies, platforms and industry organisations and is part of the World Economic Forum's Platform for Shaping the Future of Media, Entertainment and Culture.

That same year, WFA formed a steering group of advertisers and national associations to develop a set of global principles for cross-media measurement for the media ecosystem. In September 2020, an industry framework was released, which aims to set the parameters for cross-media measurement solutions. Digital platforms including Google and Meta were involved in the development of a technical proposal that meet the principles outlined in the WFA framework.

WFA is a founding member of the Unstereotype Alliance, UN Women's flagship partnership with the marketing industry to eradicate harmful gender stereotypes in advertising, launched during the 2017 Cannes Lions International Festival of Creativity. It is also a founding member of the Coalition for Better Ads, a cross-industry initiative to improve consumers’ experience with online advertising.

Each year the WFA holds Global Marketer Week, a series of events bringing together brand marketers to learn about the latest public affairs issues and best practice in marketing. In 2013 this event was held in Brussels to celebrate the organisation's 60th anniversary and in 2023 it will be held in Istanbul.

WFA also hosts the WFA Global Marketer of the Year award, an annual competition whose aim is to showcase global and regional marketers.

References

External links
 

Advertising trade associations
Advertisers
1953 establishments in Italy
Organizations established in 1953
Organisations based in Brussels
International organisations based in Belgium